Cecil A. Dolecheck (born May 30, 1951) is the Iowa State Representative from the 24th District. A Republican, he has served in the Iowa House of Representatives since 1997.  Dolecheck was born, raised, and resides in Mount Ayr, Iowa.  He attended Iowa State University.

, Dolecheck serves on several committees in the Iowa House – the Appropriations, Education, Local Government, and Natural Resources committees.  He also serves as the chair of the Education Appropriations Subcommittee.  His political experience includes serving as Assistant Majority Leader of the Iowa House and as a Ringgold County Voting Delegate with Farm Bureau.

Electoral history 
*incumbent

References

External links 

 Representative Cecil Dolecheck official Iowa General Assembly site
 
 Financial information (state office) at the National Institute for Money in State Politics
 Profile at Iowa House Republicans

Republican Party members of the Iowa House of Representatives
Living people
1951 births
People from Ringgold County, Iowa
Iowa State University alumni
21st-century American politicians